The  Miss Colorado Teen USA competition is the pageant that selects the representative for the state of Colorado in the Miss Teen USA pageant. From 1993 to 2006, the Miss Colorado Teen USA state pageant was directed by Carol Hirata and the Carlton Group, based in Bellvue, Colorado. In 2007, it was taken over by Future Productions, based in Savage, Minnesota, which also directs pageants in Iowa, Minnesota, North Dakota, South Dakota, Wisconsin and Wyoming.  The pageant have been held in Loveland, Greeley and other cities.

One of Colorado's semi-finalists was Katee Doland, a Triple Crown winner. She is one of three Miss Colorado Teen USA titleholders to win the Miss Colorado USA crown. Morgan O'Murray, Miss Colorado Teen USA 1999, also won the Miss Colorado state title for the Miss America pageant in 2000.

Chloe Fisher of Sterling was crowned Miss Colorado Teen USA 2022 on July 3, 2022, at Union Colony Civic Center in Greeley. She will represent Colorado for the title of Miss Teen USA 2022.

Results summary

Placements
Miss Teen USA: Hilary Cruz (2007)
2nd runner up : Chloe Zambrano (2018)
Top 10/12: Shalon Pecosky (1990), Amanda Aardsma (1997), Katee Doland (1998)
Top 15: Danielle Scimeca (2008), Caley-Rae Pavillard (2011)
Colorado holds a record of 7 placements at Miss Teen USA.

Awards
Miss Congeniality: Blair Griffith (2006)
Style Award: Morgan O'Murray (1999)

Winners 

1 Age at the time of the Miss Teen USA pageant

References

External links
Official website

Colorado
Women in Colorado